This tabulation is for periodicals which do not have their own articles.

Magazines

Australian Railway 
 
 Published Trade News Corporation
 Feb-Mar 1988 is Vol. 2 No. 1.
 Last issue about #23 in approximately Aug 1992.
 Size = ~A4

Australian Railways Illustrated 
 
 Bi-monthly
 Published April 2010 - April 2015
 Size = ~A4

Australian Transport 
 
 Published Chartered Institute of Logistics & Transport, Australian chapter
 Published 1952 - 1992
 Size = A4

British Railways Illustrated 
 
 published by Irwell Press; Clophill
 first issue: Oct 1991, freq: monthly, Vol 26 No 1 = Oct 2016
 Size A4
 http://www.irwellpress.com/acatalog/BRITISH_RAILWAYS_ILLUSTRATED.html

Catch Point Magazine 
 
 Published by the National Railway Museum, Port Adelaide
 Issue    : September 2022 issue is no. 271; bi-monthly
 Size     : A5.
 Web      : www.nrm.org.au
 Email    : info@nrm.org.au

Entrain 
 
 Published by Platform 5 Publishing, Sheffield, England
 first issue: Jan 2002, last issue: Dec 2005, freq: monthly
 from 2006 published as Today's Railways UK
 Size A4

Extra 2200 South
 
 Publisher : Iron Horse Publishers
 Website   : www.extra2200south.com
 Issue     : No. 131 is May 2008
 Size      : A4

GardenRail 
 
 Publisher : Atlantic Publishers
 Website   : www.alanticpublishers.com
 Issue     : No. 173 is Jan 2009
 Size      : A4

Great Western Railway Journal 
 
 Published by Cygnet Magazines, Didcot, England
 until 2014 (?) published by Wild Swan Publication
 first issue: Jan 1992, freq: quarterly, No 103 = Autumn 2017

Green over Red 
 
 Published by ????
 until April 1972
 first issue: 1966, freq: ???? ; Vol V, No 2 = Mar/Apr 1970
 Green over Red is the signal indication for "Clear Normal Speed" used by American railways and derivatives such as New Zealand and Victoria

Heritage Railway 
 
 Published by Mortons Media Group.
 Size A4

Locomotives International 
 
 Published by Mainline & Maritime
 Size A4

Mixed Goods 
 
 Namesake is a "goods train with passenger accommodation."
 c1950-c1960
 New South Wales

Narrow Gauge World 
 
 Published by Atlantic Publishers
 9 issues per year
 Size : A4
 Issue : Number 70 is July/August 2010
 Coverage : International & Modelling

Network 
 
 Published by Railways of Australia
 Issue Vol. 15 No.1 is February 1978.
 Size = A4

Paterson Points 
 
 Overview  : Magazine of the Rail Motor Society.
 Publisher : Rail Motor Society
 Namesake : The Society's Depot and Museum is located in Paterson, New South Wales.
 Size     : A4
 Period    : 2 per year
 Issue     : December 2020 is the current issue

Rail Express 
 
 Published by Mortons Media Group
 May 2019 is issue 276
 Aug 2016 is issue 243
 Feb 1997 is issue 009
 Size = A4

Railway Bylines 
 
 Britain's Light Railways, Industrial System, Country Lines, and Narrow Gauge
 Sister magazine to British Railways Illustrated.
 http://www.irwellpress.com/acatalog/RAILWAY_BYLINES.html

The Recorder 
 
 Publisher : Australian Railway Historical Society, South Australian Division
 Size      : 213mm x 140mm (approximately A5)
 Issue     : Vol. 11 No. 12. September 1974.
 Namesake  : The Recorder is the device on a locomotive that records speed; it is an early "black box".

Steam Days 
 
 Publisher : Mortons Media Group
 Size      : A4

Steam Railway 
 
 Publisher : [Great Magazines]
 Period    : monthly
 Issue     : January is No. 461
 Size      : A4
 Slogan    : The World's Biggest Selling 100% Steam Magazine.

Sunshine Express 
 
 Publisher : Australian Railway Historical Society - Queensland Division
 Size      : A5
 Period    : Monthly
 Issue     : May 1984 is Vol. 20 No. 216

Tasmanian Rail News 
 
 Published by Australian Railway Historical Society Tasmanian Division
 http://www.railtasmania.com/arhs/trn.php
 Apr 2016 is issue 258

Tin Hare Gazette 
 
 Overview  : Magazine of the Rail Motor Society.
 Publisher : Rail Motor Society
 Namesake : The Tin Hare is a colloquial name a lightweight diesel rail motor for branch line use in New South Wales.
 Size     : A5
 Period    : Irregular
 Issue     : September 2009 is issue No.45

Traction 

 Publisher : Warner Group Publications
 Period    : Six times a year
 Issue     : May/June 2021 is issue 263

Trains and Railways 
 
 Defunct

Tramway topics 
 
 Publisher :
 Size      : A4
 Issue     : No. 240 is Winter 2009
 Period    : 4 per year
 Start     : 1962

Trolley Wire 
 
 Overview  : Magazine of Australian Tram Museums.
 Size      : A5
 Issue     : No. 351 (Vol. 58 No. 4) is November 2017.
 Period    : 4 per year
 Start     : ??
 Publisher : South Pacific Electric Railway Co-operative Society

Table 

See: List of rail transport-related periodicals

Rail transport publications
Rail transport-related lists
Lists of magazines